Anthony J. Mangano is an American actor. He has guest starred in a number of notable television series, including Diff'rent Strokes, Who's the Boss?, 227, Charles in Charge, Step by Step, Murder, She Wrote, Party of Five, Spin City, Seinfeld and The Wire. He also appeared recurrently on NYPD Blue, Law & Order, Rescue Me, Blue Bloods, Public Morals, Law & Order: Special Victims Unit and Person of Interest.

Mangano has appeared in the films Point Break, 8 Heads in a Duffel Bag, Raising Helen, Inside Man, The Family, Lost Cat Corona, The Dictator, and Green Book, and in video games The Warriors, Grand Theft Auto IV, Manhunt 2, Need for Speed: Undercover and Grand Theft Auto: The Lost and Damned.

Filmography

Film

Television

Videogames

References

External links

20th-century American male actors
21st-century American male actors
American male film actors
American male television actors
American people of Italian descent
Living people
People from Brooklyn
Year of birth missing (living people)